Small and Medium Enterprise Foundation(SMEF) is a Bangladesh government owned organization that provides training and financing to small entrepreneurs. The foundation is a non-profit organization that involves the both government and small medium enterprise industry trade bodies. Professor Dr. Md. Masudur Rahman is the chairman of the Small and Medium Enterprise Foundation.

History
Small and Medium Enterprise Foundation was established in 2007 with an initial fund of 2 billion taka. It was create under the Companies Act and is guaranteed by the Ministry of Commerce. It provides training for small entrepreneurs and provides them with low cost financing.

References

2007 establishments in Bangladesh
Organisations based in Dhaka
Government agencies of Bangladesh
Foundations based in Bangladesh